State Road 22 (NM 22) is a state highway in the US state of New Mexico. NM 22's southern terminus is in the village of Budaghers at Interstate 25 (I 25)/U.S. 85 (US 85), and the  northern terminus is in Cochiti Pueblo where it continues as BIA-85.

Major intersections

See also

References

External links

022
Transportation in Sandoval County, New Mexico